Håkan Erik Nyblom (born 26 November 1981) is a retired Greco-Roman wrestler. He and his twin brother Anders were born in Finland, but competed throughout their careers for Denmark in the 55 kg featherweight division - Håkan qualified for the 2004 and 2012 Olympics, where he placed eighth and fifth, respectively, while Anders finished 11th in 2008. In 2009 Håkan won a bronze medal at the world championships, after losing to Hamid Sourian in the semifinal.

At the 2004 Olympics Håkan placed second in the preliminary pool. At the 2012 Olympics, he lost to Sourian in the semifinal, and then to Péter Módos in the bronze medal bout.

References

External links
 

Danish male sport wrestlers
Living people
Olympic wrestlers of Denmark
Wrestlers at the 2004 Summer Olympics
Wrestlers at the 2012 Summer Olympics
People from Herning Municipality
Sportspeople from Vaasa
1981 births
World Wrestling Championships medalists